Organdzali is a village in the southeastern part of North Macedonia. It is located in the municipality of Dojran.

Demographics
As of the 2021 census, Organdzali had zero residents.

According to the 2002 census, the settlement had a total of 21 inhabitants. Ethnic groups in the village include:
Turks 21

References

Villages in Dojran Municipality
Turkish communities in North Macedonia